Sergio Héctor Comba (born 15 October 1978) is a retired Argentine footballer who played as a striker.

He has played for several teams as Atlético Rafaela, Sarmiento, Ferro Carril Oeste, FC Nantes, Pistoiese, San Martín de Tucumán, Defensores, CA Huracán, Cruz Azul Hidalgo, Defensores, Atlético Rafaela, San Martín de Mendoza, YF Juventus, Sangiovannese, Celano, Defensores de Belgrano and Santiago Morning. He also had a brief spell in Ligue 1 with FC Nantes.

In mid 2009, Comba was signed for Santiago Morning, in this club he played a total of 34 matches and also scored a total of 17 goals.

References

Living people
1978 births
Argentine footballers
Argentine expatriate footballers
Cobreloa footballers
Deportes Copiapó footballers
Rangers de Talca footballers
Deportes Temuco footballers
San Luis de Quillota footballers
Santiago Morning footballers
Argentine expatriate sportspeople in Chile
Expatriate footballers in Chile
Expatriate footballers in Mexico
Expatriate footballers in France
Expatriate footballers in Italy
Argentine expatriate sportspeople in Mexico
Argentine expatriate sportspeople in France
Argentine expatriate sportspeople in Italy
Association football forwards